Kuševac   is a village in Croatia. It is connected by the D7 highway.

Populated places in Osijek-Baranja County